Thumb was a German alternative metal/nu metal band formed in Gütersloh in 1993. The group disbanded in 2005.

History 
The band recorded and copied their first home-made tapes in 1994, and signed a deal with EMI in March 1995. Thumb's debut was released in September 1995, and over the next two years, they toured as support with Bad Religion, Dog Eat Dog, Henry Rollins and Foo Fighters in Germany. In January 1997 the group began writing their second album, Exposure, released on 5 May.

Thumb also toured in the United States, joining the 1998 Vans Warped Tour to play 13 shows in three weeks. During preparations for their third album in early 2000, guitarist Axel Hilgenstöhler left the band halfway through the year, and was replaced by Axel Pralat. Everything written and recorded up to that point was discarded.

Thumb disbanded in 2005. Since then, Steffen Wilmking has joined H-Blockx, Jens Gössling is in Taetowier Studio, Jan-Hendrik Meyer is in Hudson, Claus Grabke is in Alternative Allstars, and Axel Pralat is in Waterdown.

Members 
 Axel Pralat – guitar (2000–2005)
 Jens Gössling – DJ (1994–2005)
 Steffen Wilmking – drums (1994–2005)
 Jan-Hendrik Meyer – bass (1994–2005)
 Claus Grabke – vocals (1994–2005)
 Axel Hilgenstöhler – guitar (1994–2000)

Timeline

Discography

Albums 
Thumb
Released: 1995 (Netherlands) on Spin Records 
Track listing: 

Thumb (Encore)
Released: 25 July 1996 (Germany) on Spin Records
Track listing: 
Exposure
Released: 1 April 1997 (Netherlands, UK, Germany) on Spin Records 
Released: 23 June 1998 (USA) on Victory Records 
Track listing: 

Maximum Exposure
Released: 28 November 1997 on Spin Records
Track listing: 
3 (Three)
Released: 2001 (USA) on Victory Records 
Released: 10 July 2001 (Germany) on EMI Electrola 
Track listing:

Singles 
"Red Alert" (1995)
"No More Blood" (1996)
"Red Alert '96" (1996)
"Aside" (1996)
"Sell Myself" (1997)
"Seize The Day" (1997)
"Break Me" (1998)
"Down Like Me" (2001)
"Youth" (2001)

References

External links 
Official website

Musical groups established in 1993
Alternative metal musical groups
German hardcore punk groups
German nu metal musical groups
Victory Records artists